The Loves of Letty is a 1919 American silent drama film produced and distributed by Samuel Goldwyn and directed by Frank Lloyd. Based on the play Letty by Arthur Wing Pinero, the film features Pauline Frederick in the title role. It was originally considered a lost film, but a print with some deterioration has reportedly been found in a European collection.

Cast
Pauline Frederick as Letty Shell
John Bowers as Richard Perry
Lawson Butt as Neville Letchmore
Willard Louis as Bernard Mandeville
Florence Deshon as Marion Allardyce
Lela Bliss as Hilda Gunning (credited as Leila Bliss)
Leota Lorraine as Florence Crosby
Sidney Ainsworth as Ivor Crosby
Harland Tucker as Coppy Drake
Joan Standing as Slavey

References

External links

 
 

1919 films
1919 drama films
Silent American drama films
American silent feature films
American black-and-white films
American films based on plays
Films directed by Frank Lloyd
Goldwyn Pictures films
1910s rediscovered films
Rediscovered American films
1910s American films